Olav Njølstad (born 1 March 1957) is a Norwegian historian, biographer and novelist. He is director of the Norwegian Nobel Institute.

Literary background
As a novelist he made his literary debut in 2003 with the thriller Mannen med oksehjertet, and wrote the novel Brennofferet in 2005.

His biography of resistance leader, government minister and lawyer Jens Christian Hauge (Jens Chr. Hauge – fullt og helt from 2008) was well received by the critics.

Selected works
Kunnskap om våpen: forsvarets forskningsinstitutt 1946 – 1975 (1997) (With Olav Wicken) 
Strålende forskning: Institutt for energiteknikk 1948 – 1998 (1999) 
War and Peace in the 20th Century and Beyond (edited with Geir Lundestad, 2002) 
Mannen med oksehjertet (thriller, 2003)
Brennofferet (novel, 2005)
Norske nobelprisvinnere: fra Bjørnson til Kydland (2005)
Jens Chr. Hauge – fullt og helt (biography, 2008)

References

20th-century Norwegian historians
21st-century Norwegian novelists
Norwegian biographers
Male biographers
1957 births
Living people
Norwegian crime fiction writers
Norwegian male novelists
21st-century Norwegian male writers
21st-century Norwegian historians